Kaspar Kokk (born August 3, 1982 in Tartu) is an Estonian cross-country skier. He competed at the 2006 Winter Olympics in Turin. He represents Estonia at the 2010 Winter Olympics in Vancouver, British Columbia, Canada. Kokk's best finish was 14th in the 4 x 10 km relay at the 2010 Games.

His best finish was the FIS Nordic World Ski Championships was eighth in the 4 x 10 km relay at Liberec in 2009. Kokk's best World Cup finish was 11th in a 4 x 10 km relay at Norway in November 2009 while his best individual finish was 16th in a 15 km +15 km double pursuit event in Germany in 2006.

References

External links

1982 births
Cross-country skiers at the 2006 Winter Olympics
Cross-country skiers at the 2010 Winter Olympics
Estonian male cross-country skiers
Living people
Olympic cross-country skiers of Estonia
Sportspeople from Tartu
21st-century Estonian people